Concord Township may refer to the following places in the United States:

Illinois
 Concord Township, Adams County, Illinois
 Concord Township, Bureau County, Illinois
 Concord Township, Iroquois County, Illinois

Indiana
 Concord Township, DeKalb County, Indiana
 Concord Township, Elkhart County, Indiana

Iowa
 Concord Township, Dubuque County, Iowa
 Concord Township, Hancock County, Iowa
 Concord Township, Hardin County, Iowa
 Concord Township, Louisa County, Iowa

Kansas
 Concord Township, Ford County, Kansas

Michigan
 Concord Township, Michigan

Minnesota
 Concord Township, Minnesota

Missouri
 Concord Township, Clinton County, Missouri
 Concord Township, Pemiscot County, Missouri
 Concord Township, Washington County, Missouri

Nebraska
 Concord Township, Dixon County, Nebraska

North Carolina
 Concord Township, Iredell County, North Carolina

Ohio
 Concord Township, Champaign County, Ohio
 Concord Township, Delaware County, Ohio
 Concord Township, Fayette County, Ohio
 Concord Township, Highland County, Ohio
 Concord Township, Lake County, Ohio
 Concord Township, Miami County, Ohio
 Concord Township, Ross County, Ohio

Pennsylvania
 Concord Township, Butler County, Pennsylvania
 Concord Township, Delaware County, Pennsylvania
 Concord Township, Erie County, Pennsylvania

See also
 Concord (disambiguation)

Township name disambiguation pages